Giurgița is a commune in Dolj County, Oltenia, Romania. It is composed of three villages: Curmătura, Filaret and Giurgița.

References

Communes in Dolj County
Localities in Oltenia